General Marsh may refer to:

C. Carroll Marsh (born 1829), Union Army brigadier general of U.S. Volunteers
James Marsh (British Army officer) (died 1804), British Army general
Linda M. Marsh (fl. 1980s–2020s), U.S. Air Force major general
Mary A. Marsh (born 1930), U.S. Air Force brigadier general
Robert T. Marsh (1925–2017), U.S. Air Force four-star general